Bahawalpur Division is an administrative division of the Punjab Province, Pakistan. The reforms of 2000 abolished the third tier of government but division system was restored again in 2008.

Districts

It contains the following districts:

 Bahawalnagar District
 Bahawalpur District
 Rahim Yar Khan District

Demographics 
According to the 2017 census, Bahawalpur division has a population of 11,452,594, which includes 5,851,909 males and 5,599,461 females. Bahawalpur division constitutes 11,210,997 Muslims, 188,252 Hindus, 39,401 Christians, 4,703 Ahmadis followed by 5,523 scheduled castes and 3,718 others.

See also
 Divisions of Pakistan
 Divisions of Punjab, Pakistan

References

 
Divisions of Punjab, Pakistan